Butte City is a city in Butte County, Idaho, United States. The population was 74 at the 2010 census.

Geography
Butte City is located at  (43.608243, -113.245449).

Demographics

2010 census
At the 2010 census, there were 74 people, 41 households and 22 families residing in the city. The racial makeup was 86.5% White, 2.7% African American, 4.1% Native American, 5.4% from other races, and 1.4% from two or more races. Hispanic or Latino of any race were 13.5% of the population.

There were 41 households, of which 9.8% had children under the age of 18 living with them, 51.2% were married couples living together, 2.4% had a male householder with no wife present, and 46.3% were non-families. 41.5% of all households were made up of individuals, and 14.7% had someone living alone who was 65 years of age or older. The average household size was 1.80 and the average family size was 2.36.

The median age was 58.5 years. 9.5% of residents were under the age of 18; 1.4% were between the ages of 18 and 24; 16.3% were from 25 to 44; 39.2% were from 45 to 64; and 33.8% were 65 years of age or older. The gender makeup was 58.1% male and 41.9% female.

2000 census
At the 2000 census, there were 76 people, 36 households and 19 families residing in the city. The racial makeup was 90.79% White, 1.32% Native American, 2.63% Asian, 5.26% from other races. Hispanic or Latino of any race were 10.53% of the population.

There were 36 households, of which 22.2% had children under the age of 18 living with them, 41.7% were married couples living together, 2.8% had a female householder with no husband present, and 47.2% were non-families. 38.9% of all households were made up of individuals, and 11.1% had someone living alone who was 65 years of age or older. The average household size was 2.11 and the average family size was 2.74.

23.7% of the population were under the age of 18, 6.6% from 18 to 24, 25.0% from 25 to 44, 36.8% from 45 to 64, and 7.9% who were 65 years of age or older. The median age was 40 years. For every 100 females, there were 105.4 males. For every 100 females age 18 and over, there were 123.1 males.

The median household income was $17,250 and the median family income was $31,250. Males had a median income of $35,625 and females $22,500. The per capita income was $11,889. There were 25.0% of families and 30.7% of the population living below the poverty line, including 45.8% of under eighteens and none of those over 64.

References

Cities in Butte County, Idaho
Cities in Idaho